Cardiff is a surname. Notable people with the surname include:

Craig Cardiff, Canadian musician
Elston Cardiff, Canadian politician
Gladys Cardiff, American poet
Jack Cardiff (1914–2009), British cinematographer
Janet Cardiff, Canadian artist
Jim Cardiff, Canadian ice hockey player
Murray Cardiff (1934–2013), Canadian politician
Steve Cardiff, Canadian politician